John Logan is an American playwright, screenwriter, film producer, and television producer.

He is a three-time Academy Award nominee; twice for Best Original Screenplay for Gladiator (2000) and The Aviator (2004) and once for Best Adapted Screenplay for Hugo (2011). He is also a two time Tony Award nominee for Best Play for Red in 2010 and Best Book of a Musical for Moulin Rouge! in 2021. He also was nominated for a Primetime Emmy Award for Outstanding Writing for a Limited Series or Movie for RKO 281 in 2000.

He also has received nominations and wins from the British Academy Film Awards, Golden Globe Awards, Critics Choice Awards, and Writers Guild of America Awards.

Major associations

Academy Awards

Primetime Emmy Awards

Tony Awards

Industry awards

British Academy Film Awards

Golden Globe Awards

Writers Guild of America Awards

Miscellaneous awards

References 

Logan, John